Yanagihara Station is the name of multiple train stations in Japan.

 Yanagihara Station (Ehime) (柳原駅) in Ehime Prefecture
 Yanagihara Station (Iwate) (柳原駅) in Iwate Prefecture
 Yanagihara Station (Nagano) (柳原駅) in Nagano Prefecture